Ibrahim Said may refer to:
 Ibrahim Said (footballer, born 1979)
 Ibrahim Said (footballer, born 2002)